Săvinești is a commune in Neamț County, Western Moldavia, Romania. It is composed of two villages, Dumbrava-Deal and Săvinești.

The Săvinești Industrial Park (one of the biggest chemical plants in Romania) is located there.

Natives
 Marian Drăghiceanu

References

Communes in Neamț County
Localities in Western Moldavia